Kompaniivka is an urban-type settlement in Kropyvnytskyi Raion, Kirovohrad Oblast (region) of central Ukraine. It hosts the administration of Kompaniivka settlement hromada, one of the hromadas of Ukraine. Population: .

History
Kompaniivka was founded in the second half of 18th century on the left bank of the Suhokleya-Komyshuvata river, a tributary of the Inhul. The settlers were former Cossacks Kompaniiskyi regiments.  They had been Hetman light cavalry, whose were guarding the southern and western borders and providing an intelligence service. Probably this happened after the reform of October 24, 1775.

Before the soldiers arrived, there were farmers growing wheat, rye, barley and oats and raising livestock.  The lands and the peasants farming them were taken over by the nobility in 1782.

Military reform caused a significant settlement of former Kompaniian.  After retirement they were assigned to a particular social status, such as Burghers, peasants or Cossacks.

In the 1850s Kompaniivka became the center of parish of the same name in Elisavetgrad County. In the 1890s the Kompaniivka Paper factory was built in the town; its production was the largest in the region and fourth in Ukraine.

In July 1933, the village became the center of the newly created district of Odessa Oblast. In 1965, Kompaniivka received the status of an urban-type settlement (town).

Until 18 July 2020, Kompaniivka was the administrative center of Kompaniivka Raion. The raion was abolished in July 2020 as part of the administrative reform of Ukraine, which reduced the number of raions of Kirovohrad Oblast to four. The area of Kompaniivka Raion was merged into Kropyvnytskyi Raion.

Infrastructure

Economy
Most of Kompaniivka Raion's industrial activity took place in Kompaniivka.  The settlement's manufacturing plants are:

 Kompaniivka feed mill
 Kompaniivka agrochemistry
 "Kirovograd", a gas compressor station
 Zhyvanivka granite quarry
 Sausage shop
 Bakery

Education
 Kompaniivka technical college veterinary medicine Bila Tserkva national agricultural university  over the years, has trained about 4 thousand specialists veterinary medicine. For the third consecutive group of students of probation in England, three years technical college holds first place in the organization and conduct of educational practice among students of agricultural schools.
 School of Kompaniivka

Medicine
The village houses the district's central hospital.

Culture
Kompaniivka has a children's music school. It 5 departments and 119 pupils study there. The school's nine teachers teach the children to play piano, accordion, wind instruments and guitar, and there are also lessons in choreography and the visual arts. The school has several teams that compete nationally.

The town also has the Museum Raion House of Culture and the raion library with about 26 thousand books (Kirov str. 14-a).

References

Sources
 Accounting card of town on site of Verkhovna Rada of Ukraine
 Kompaniivka Raion State Administration
 Kompaniivka raion on who-is-who.ua
 Official site Kompaniivka technical college veterinary medicine

Urban-type settlements in Kropyvnytskyi Raion